Christian Ramirez (born April 4, 1991) is an American professional soccer player who plays as a forward for Major League Soccer club Columbus Crew.

Early life and education 
Born in Santa Ana, California, Ramirez attended La Quinta High School in Westminster, California near his hometown of Garden Grove where he played center midfield and forward. As a freshman, he scored 17 goals and tallied 10 assists. During his sophomore year, he scored 18 goals and served eight assists. He opted not to play for the high school team during his junior and senior seasons. Ramirez played for the Olympic Development Program (ODP) and earned the Golden Boot award at the nationals in 2008 after the squad won the tournament. He was named team captain for three seasons.

Ramirez played two years at Concordia University Irvine (CUI) in California after starting his college career at UC Santa Barbara, where he appeared 24 times in two years, making two starts and scoring one goal. The 6'2" forward finished his CUI career with 44 goals and 18 assists. While at Concordia, Ramirez was named NAIA First Team All-American in 2012 while recording 23 goals and 6 assists and was also the GSAC 2012 Player of the Year. In 2011, Ramirez was named All-GSAC First Team and broke the school record for points in a game with five goals and three assists for 13 points against William Jessup. Ramirez tied the school single season mark for points with 48 in 2011 and would go on to set the school record for points in a season with 52 in 2012.

Club career

Charlotte Eagles 
In 2013, Ramirez signed with the Charlotte Eagles of the USL PRO. He made his debut for the squad in a match against Antigua Barracuda FC, in which he tallied his first professional goal and was named to the USL Pro Team of the Week. Ramirez finished the regular season with 8 goals and 5 assists. He continued his form into the postseason, scoring 4 goals in 3 playoff appearances and helping lead the Eagles to the USL Pro Championship, where they lost to Orlando City SC.

Minnesota United FC 
On January 8, 2014, Minnesota United FC announced that they had signed Ramirez for the 2014 NASL season. After first-choice striker Pablo Campos suffered a torn ACL in preseason, Ramirez enjoyed a breakout season while starting every game. Ramirez was named NASL Player of the Week three times, and the NASL Player of the Month three times, for May/June, August, and October/November.

On the final game of the 2014 NASL Season, Ramirez scored his 20th goal, equaling the league record held by Campos and Etienne Barbara. Ramirez won the 2014 NASL Golden Boot by an 8-goal margin and the NASL Young Player of the Year award. Due to his performances, Ramirez was named in NASL's Best XI for 2014 and went on to earn the same honor in both the 2015 and 2016 seasons. Ramirez again won the NASL Golden Boot in 2016 after tallying 18 goals in 31 appearances. Ramirez holds the club record for both appearances and goals (95 and 53 respectively) for the now defunct NASL version of Minnesota United after they folded due to being selected for MLS expansion.

With Minnesota United's move to Major League Soccer, Ramirez was signed to an MLS contract, which was announced in January 2017. On March 3 Minnesota played their first game in MLS history, a 5–1 loss at the Portland Timbers, with Ramirez scoring the goal, MNUFC's first in MLS.  He helped Minnesota earn their first point in league history on March 18, scoring once in a 2–2 draw at the Colorado Rapids. On April 1, Ramirez scored twice to help give the Loons a 4–2 win over Real Salt Lake.  Ramirez scored once in a 4–0 win over D.C. United on July 29, but had to leave the game early due to a hamstring injury. After missing 4 games, he returned to action on September 16, coming off the bench in a 3–0 loss to Vancouver Whitecaps.  Ramirez scored his first goal since returning from injury on September 16 to help the Loons to a 3–1 win over the Montreal Impact.  On September 23, he scored once and added two assists to help Minnesota defeat FC Dallas 4–1.  On October 3, Ramirez scored in the 90th minute to level the score with Atlanta United at 2.  Kevin Molino would score in the 96th minute to give the Loons a 3–2 win.  Ramirez ended the season with 14 goals and 3 assists from 30 appearances.  Despite the strong play from Ramirez, Minnesota finished 9th in the Western Conference and failed to qualify for the playoffs.

Minnesota opened 2018 on March 3 with a 3–2 loss at the San Jose Earthquakes, with Ramirez picking up an assist in the game. After being scoreless in the first 6 games, he found the back of the net on April 22 in a 3–1 defeat to the Seattle Sounders.  Between May 12 and June 23, Ramirez scored 3 times in a 5-game stretch in MLS play.  On July 18, he scored once to help Minnesota to a 2–1 win over the New England Revolution.  On July 22, Ramirez scored 2 goals and had one assist as the Loons beat LAFC 5–1.

Los Angeles FC 
On August 6, 2018, Ramirez was traded to Los Angeles FC in exchange for $250,000 in General Allocation Money in 2018 and 2019, $100,000 in Targeted Allocation Money in 2018, $200,000 in Targeted Allocation Money in 2019, and up to $200,000 in future Allocation Money based on the player's performance. Should Ramirez satisfy all performance metrics, the total transfer fee will be $1,000,000. Ramirez made his LAFC debut on August 11, coming on as a sub in a 2–0 loss to Sporting Kansas City.  On August 15, 2018, Ramirez scored his first two LAFC goals in a 2–0 win against Real Salt Lake. He would go scoreless for his next 5 appearances, but in the 1st game of the 2018 MLS Cup Playoffs, Ramirez would score to give LAFC a lead in the 54th minute. However, Real Salt Lake would come back to win 3–2 to eliminate LAFC and Ramirez.  He finished his debut season for LAFC with 8 appearances and 3 goals across all competitions.

In 2019, LAFC got off to a strong start to the season. Ramirez picked up his first goal of the season in matchweek 2 in a 4–1 win over the Portland Timbers. Ramirez started the season as the team's starting striker, in part due to Adama Diomande not being fully fit.  On July 3, Ramirez had one goal and one assist in a 5–1 win over Sporting Kansas City.  He ended his 2nd season for LAFC having scored 4 goals from 20 appearances in all competitions.

Houston Dynamo 
On August 7, 2019, Ramirez was traded to Houston Dynamo in exchange for $250,000 in allocation money. Ramirez made his Dynamo debut and scored his first goal for his new club on August 11 in a 2–1 loss to the Philadelphia Union.  On September 11, the Dynamo hosted Ramirez's old team, Minnesota. He scored once as the Dynamo defeated the Loons 2–0. In the final game of the season, Ramirez scored twice, including the winner in the 83rd minute, to help Houston defeat the LA Galaxy 4–2.  He enjoyed good form to end the year, scoring 5 and assisting 1 in his 10 games with the Dynamo.  His good performances weren't enough to save the Dynamo's season however, with Houston failing to qualify for the playoffs.

After the first two games of the 2020 season, with Ramirez appearing off the bench in both, the season was paused for four months due to the COVID-19 pandemic.  Houston returned to play in July with the MLS is Back Tournament, however Ramirez did not take part, leaving the "bubble" to be with his wife for the birth of their second child.  He rejoined the team after the tournament and made his first start of the year on August 21 in a 0–0 draw with FC Dallas.  On August 25 Ramirez scored once and added an assist as Houston won 5–2 at Sporting Kansas City.  He found the back of the net again on September 9 to give Houston a 1–1 draw at the Colorado Rapids.  In a shortened season due to COVID-19, Ramirez ended the season with 2 goals and 2 assists from 15 games, 8 of them being starts.  It was another disappointing season for the Dynamo as a team, finishing bottom of the Western Conference and missing the playoffs again.

During the 2021 season, Ramirez only made 6 appearances before being transferred.  He scored in his only start, a 3–1 loss at the Colorado Rapids on May 15.

Aberdeen
On June 28, 2021, Ramirez signed with Scottish Premiership side Aberdeen. Ramirez made his Aberdeen debut on 22 July in the new Europa Conference League where he scored in the 5–1 victory over BK Häcken of Sweden.

Columbus Crew
On January 19, 2023, Ramirez joined Major League Soccer club Columbus Crew on a two year deal with an option for a third year.

International career 
On January 8, 2018, Ramirez received a call-up for the United States men's national soccer team for a friendly against Bosnia and Herzegovina. He made his first appearance as a substitute against Panama on January 27, 2019, along with scoring his first goal for the senior team.

Career statistics

Club

International 
As of November 14, 2020

Scores and results list United States' goal tally first.

Source: US Soccer

Personal life
Ramirez's father, Juan, is a Colombian former footballer, who immigrated to the United States prior to Christian's birth. Juan stopped pursuing his soccer career in order to move his family to California. Ramirez says one of his motivations for playing soccer is to "live out [Juan's] dream that he wasn't able to." He was raised in a Catholic home and is a Christian. Christian and his wife Valerie have two daughters together. Ramirez developed a strong friendship with fellow Californian and former Orange County Blue Star and Minnesota United teammate Miguel Ibarra. Ramirez and Ibarra were nicknamed "Superman" and "Batman" by the Minnesota fans.

Honors
Minnesota United
NASL Spring Season: 2014
North American Supporter's Trophy: 2014

Individual
NASL Best XI: 2014, 2015, 2016
NASL Golden Boot: 2014, 2016
North American Soccer League Young Player of the Year: 2014
NASL Player of the Month – May/June 2014, August 2014, October/November 2014, July 2015, July 2016
NASL Player of the Week – Week 4 2016, Week 12 2016

References

External links 

 Minnesota United player profile
 
 
 UC Santa Barbara player profile
 

1991 births
Living people
Aberdeen F.C. players
American expatriate soccer players
American expatriate sportspeople in Scotland
American soccer players
American sportspeople of Colombian descent
Association football forwards
Columbus Crew players
Charlotte Eagles players
Expatriate footballers in Scotland
Houston Dynamo FC players
Los Angeles FC players
Major League Soccer players
Minnesota United FC (2010–2016) players
Minnesota United FC players
North American Soccer League players
Orange County Blue Star players
People from Garden Grove, California
Scottish Professional Football League players
Soccer players from California
Sportspeople from Santa Ana, California
UC Santa Barbara Gauchos men's soccer players
United States men's international soccer players
USL Championship players
USL League Two players